Jean-Luc Boulay (born 1955) is a French-born chef, restaurateur and television personality who emigrated to Canada in 1976, and founded his first restaurant Le Saint-Amour in Quebec City with his business partner Jacques Fortier in 1978, which over the years was repeatedly honoured and is recognized as one of the best fine dining restaurants in Quebec and Canada, specializing in local products such as foie gras, and also known as Paul McCartney’s favourite restaurant in town. In April 2012, he opened with chef Arnaud Marchand a Nordic-inspired restaurant, Chez Boulay - Bistro boréal, located on rue Saint-Jean, a lively street of Old Quebec. In April 2019, he also opened the restaurant Les Botanistes which pays particular homage to plant-based dishes, with his business partners Pierre Joubaud and Arnaud Marchand.

Along with Normand Laprise and Pasquale Vari, Jean-Luc Boulay is one of the three permanent judges on Quebec’s top cooking competition TV show Les chefs! broadcast on ICI Radio-Canada Télé since 14 June 2010, which is hosted by Élyse Marquis et Daniel Vézina.

Boulay's recognition and awards include being named French Master Chef (Maître cuisiner de France) in March 2012, and Officer of the Ordre National du Mérite Agricole in France in 2017.

References 

French chefs
1955 births
Living people
People from Sarthe
Canadian male chefs